Starvation Lake is a recreational and fishing lake in Kalkaska County, in the U.S. state of Michigan. The lake is fed primarily from submerged springs with the remainder from direct rainfall and runoff.

The unusual name has been explained in local folklore.  The area around the lake, prior to being developed, was used primarily for hunting and trapping.  It has been said that a hunter was setting traps near the water's edge when he got trapped in one himself.  Before help could arrive he had died from starvation. Another story is that criminals were hiding out in the area, there was a snow fall and couldn't make it to town so they were stranded there and died from starvation.

See also
List of lakes in Michigan

External links
Michigan DNR map of Starvation Lake

References

Lakes of Kalkaska County, Michigan
Lakes of Michigan